Anthony Allen Shore (June 25, 1962 – January 18, 2018) was an American serial killer and child molester who was responsible for the murders of one woman and three girls. He was active from 1986 to 2000, and became known as the "Tourniquet Killer" because of his use of a ligature with either a toothbrush or bamboo stick to tighten or loosen the ligature. The instrument was similar to a garotte or a twitch, a tool used by farmers to control horses. Shore was sentenced to death in 2004, and executed by lethal injection on January 18, 2018.

Early life
Shore was born in Rapid City, South Dakota, to Robert and Deanna Shore. His parents were both in the military, and the family, which grew to include Shore and two younger sisters Laurel and Gina, moved frequently; they eventually settled in Houston, Texas. Shore's parents fought constantly and engaged in extramarital affairs before finally divorcing in 1976. He later claimed that his father frequently beat him, and that his mother molested him when he was 13. He exhibited antisocial behavior from a young age, killing a neighbor's cat and harassing and molesting his female classmates and, sometimes, younger friends of his sisters.

He married Gina Lynn Worley in 1983 and they had two daughters; Amber and Tiffany. The couple later divorced a decade later. He married Amy Lynch in 1997, and divorced after she accused him of abuse. At his murder trial, Anthony's daughters would later say their father drugged, abused, and raped them.

Murders and assaults

Laurie Lee Tremblay
Shore's first known victim was 15-year-old Laurie Tremblay, whom he killed on September 26, 1986. Tremblay was walking to school when she was attacked. After attempting to sexually assault her, Shore strangled Tremblay. Her body was dumped behind a Mexican restaurant in Houston.

Maria del Carmen Estrada
Shore sexually assaulted and strangled Maria del Carmen Estrada, 21, on April 16, 1992. Estrada was a Mexican immigrant, working as a nanny. Estrada's body was found in the back of a Dairy Queen that same day.

Selma Janske
On October 19, 1993, Shore entered the home of 14-year-old Selma Janske, then bound and sexually assaulted her; he then fled the scene on foot.

Diana Rebollar
Shore beat, sexually assaulted, and strangled Diana Rebollar, 9, on August 8, 1994. She lived in the Houston Heights area of Houston, at the front of a small duplex. On the day of her death, she was seen at a local grocery store. Employees saw her leave the store safely, but she never returned home. She was found the next day on a loading dock behind a building. Police were given a lead by a neighbor who described a van that frequented the area. She was connected to the Maria del Carmen Estrada case by the killer's modus operandi: a rope with a bamboo stick attached was found around her neck.

Dana Sanchez
Shore strangled Dana Sanchez, 16, on July 6, 1995. Shore offered her a ride in his van and killed her after she rejected his sexual advances. Seven days later an anonymous telephone call to a local news station, actually made by Shore, directed police to her body in a Harris County field.

Investigation
In 1998, Shore was convicted of molesting his two daughters; as a result he was required to provide police with a DNA sample. In 2000, detectives pulled Maria del Carmen Estrada's case from the cold files, tested DNA evidence from underneath Estrada's fingernails, and received a full genetic profile. The results were not immediately matched to Shore because of problems at the lab. As a result of an audit, the lab was closed in 2002; however, certain samples, including those taken from Estrada's  nails, were sent to another laboratory for retesting. The results were not matched until 2003, which led to Shore's arrest for Estrada's murder.

Eleven hours into his interrogation Shore confessed to the murders of Maria del Carmen Estrada, Diana Rebollar, and Dana Sanchez. He also confessed to the 1987 murder of 14-year-old Laurie Tremblay and a 1994 rape of a 14-year-old girl. Detectives had no way of linking Tremblay's killing to the other three murders because she had been strangled with a ligature. When asked why he switched to a tourniquet, Shore replied, "because I hurt my finger while murdering Tremblay."

Trial and conviction
Despite Shore's confession to the murders of the three girls, Estrada and the rape of 14-year old Selma Janske, prosecutor Kelly Siegler decided to only charge Shore for Estrada's murder because it contained the most forensic evidence. His trial began in late October 2004. The jury found Shore guilty of capital murder. During the sentencing phase, Shore's only surviving victim testified. After less than an hour of deliberations, the jury recommended that Shore be put to death, which Shore himself had asked for. He was sentenced to death on November 15, 2004.

Execution
Shore was executed by lethal injection on January 18, 2018, at 6:28 p.m. (CST), and was the first person executed in the United States in 2018. He was 55 years old. Before the execution he confessed that "I made my peace" and his last words were "Ooh-ee, I can feel that!".

In media 
Anthony Shore's daughter Tiffany gave many interviews about her father and the abuse she and her sister went through. She was featured in many documentaries, including: Evil Lives Here and Living with a Serial Killer.

This was also covered by many documentary series, including: Cold Case Files, Inside the Mind of a Serial Killer, Mark of a Killer and Signs of a Psychopath.

See also
 List of people executed in Texas, 2010–2019
 List of people executed in the United States in 2018
 List of serial killers in the United States

References 

1962 births
2018 deaths
20th-century American criminals
21st-century executions by Texas
American male criminals
American murderers of children
American people convicted of child sexual abuse
American people convicted of drug offenses
American people convicted of kidnapping
American people convicted of murder
American rapists
Executed American serial killers
Male serial killers
People convicted of murder by Texas
People executed by Texas by lethal injection
People executed for murder
People from Rapid City, South Dakota